The Volleyball Federation of Montenegro (OSCG) (Montenegrin: Odbojkaški savez Crne Gore) is the governing body of volleyball in Montenegro. It is based in Podgorica.

It organizes the volleyball leagues:
 Montenegrin women's volley league
 Montenegrin men volleyball league
 Montenegrin women's second volleyball League
 Montenegrin Cup / women
 Montenegrin Cup / men

It also organizes the Montenegrin national volleyball team and the Montenegro national women's volleyball team. 

The biggest result is winning title in European League 2014, after beating Greece in final. After that, Montenegro team qualified for first ever appearance in FIVB World League 2015.

Men National Team of Montenegro competed in FIVB World League 2015 for the first time in their history. They played in 3rd group in pool F with Turkey, Tunis and Puerto Rico. Montenegro finished first in group and proceed to final tournament in Slovakia. In semifinal Montenegro beat China 3:1, and in final lost after thrilling match 3:2 from Egypt.

OSCG was formed in 1958. It is a member of the Fédération Internationale de Volleyball and the Confédération Européenne de Volleyball.

See also
Montenegro women's national volleyball team
Montenegro men's national volleyball team
Montenegrin women's volley league
Montenegrin men's volleyball League
Montenegrin women's volleyball Cup
Montenegrin men's volleyball Cup

External links
Official web site

Montenegro
Volleyball
Volleyball in Montenegro